A gold–aluminium intermetallic is an intermetallic compound of gold and aluminium that occurs at contacts between the two metals. 

These intermetallics have different properties from the individual metals, which can cause problems in wire bonding in microelectronics. The main compounds formed are Au5Al2 (white plague) and AuAl2 (purple plague), which both form at high temperatures. 

White plague is the name of the compound Au5Al2 as well as the problem it causes. It has low electrical conductivity, so its formation at the joint leads to an increase of electrical resistance which can lead to total failure. Purple plague (sometimes known as purple death or Roberts-Austen's purple gold) is a brittle, bright-purple compound, AuAl2, or about 78.5% Au and 21.5% Al by mass. AuAl2 is the most stable thermally of the Au–Al intermetallic compounds, with a melting point of 1060°C (see phase diagram), similar to that of pure gold. The process of the growth of the intermetallic layers causes reduction in volume, and hence creates cavities in the metal near the interface between gold and aluminium.

Other gold–aluminium intermetallics can cause problems as well. Below 624°C, purple plague is replaced by Au2Al, a tan-colored substance. It is a poor conductor and can cause electrical failure of the joint that can lead to mechanical failure. At lower temperatures, about 400–450°C, an interdiffusion process takes place at the junction. This leads to formation of layers of several intermetallic compounds with different compositions, from gold-rich to aluminium-rich, with different growth rates. Cavities form as the denser, faster-growing layers consume the slower-growing ones. This process, known as Kirkendall voiding, leads to both increased electrical resistance and mechanical weakening of the wire bond. When the voids are collected along the diffusion front, a process aided by contaminants present in the lattice, it is known as Horsting voiding, a process similar to and often confused with Kirkendall voiding.

All problems caused by gold–aluminium intermetallics can be prevented either by using bonding processes that avoid high temperatures (e.g. ultrasonic welding), or by designing circuitry in such a way as to avoid aluminium-to-gold contact using aluminium-to-aluminium or gold-to-gold junctions.

See also
 Tin whiskers

External links 
 Harvard: Gold Aluminium Intermetallics
 Aluminium aurate – purple gold

Corrosion
Gold
Aluminides
Integrated circuits
Intermetallics